Valadabad (also Romanized as Valadābād and Waladābād) is a village in Iran. It is located in Zahray-ye Bala Rural District, in the Central District of Buin Zahra County, Qazvin Province. At the 2006 census, its population was 808, in 222 families.

References 

Populated places in Buin Zahra County